Barthold Johan Halle (born 22 May 1925) is a Norwegian stage instructor and theatre director. He worked for Studioteatret from 1947, was stage instructor at Rogaland Teater from 1949 to 1952, and joined Folketeatret from 1952 to 1959. He directed the films Afrikaneren from 1966, and Ungen from 1974. He was theatre director at Oslo Nye Teater from 1978 to 1984.

References

1925 births
People from Horten
Norwegian theatre directors
Living people